Donja Kupčina is a village located in the Municipality of Pisarovina, in Zagreb County, Croatia. It is connected by the D36 highway.

References

Populated places in Zagreb County